Baba Sheykh Ali (also Romanized as Bābā Sheykh ‘Alī and Bābā Sheykh‘alī; also known as Emāmīyeh) is a village in Satar Rural District, Kolyai District, Sonqor County, Kermanshah Province, Iran. At the 2006 census, its population was 198, in 51 families.

babasheikhali has a beautiful new mosque on the eastern side of the village. People come to this place for all three promises of prayers.

References 

Populated places in Sonqor County